Gabriel Syveton (21 February 1864 – 8 December 1904) was a French historian and politician.
He was one of the founding members of the patriotic and anti-Dreyfus Ligue de la patrie française.
He was elected as deputy for the Seine in 1902.
He was involved in scandal when he exposed the existence of a card file compiled from Freemason reports on public officials.
It listed practicing Catholics, who should be passed over for promotion. 
He died, possibly from suicide, the day before being required to appear in court after physically attacking the Minister of War in the Chamber of Deputies.

Life

Early years
Gabriel Syveton was born on 21 February 1864 in Boën-sur-Lignon, Loire.
He studied in Lyon and then in Paris, and passed his agrégation in history in 1888 as a doctor of letters and associate professor.
He taught in turn at the lycées of Aix-en-Provence, Laon, Angoulême and Reims.
From 1890 to 1892 the Ministry of Public Instruction and Fine Arts assigned him to a study mission in Austria-Hungary.
He resigned in 1898 so he could follow a career in politics.

Ligue de la patrie française

The Ligue de la patrie française originated in 1898 with three young academics, Louis Dausset, Syveton and Henri Vaugeois, who wanted to show that support for Alfred Dreyfus,  a French Jewish artillery officer who had been controversially convicted in 1894 on charges of treason, was not accepted by all university academics.
The three circulated a manifesto that stated,

The manifesto attacked Émile Zola and what many saw as an internationalist, pacifist left-wing conspiracy.
At first the manifesto was circulated only among lycée professors in Paris, but Maurice Barrès encouraged them to invite more professionals opposed to Dreyfus to sign, and to form the Ligue de la patrie française to implement the manifesto. 
After founding the League Syveton was asked to resume his university duties.
Several days later he made a speech before the Academic Council of Paris that the League published as propaganda brochure under the title The University and the Nation.
Syveton was suspended for a year, and after this had elapsed he was dismissed when he refused the various positions that were offered to him.

At meetings of the League around France, Syveton and François Coppée also claimed that the French Masons were a subversive influence in France, directed by the supreme head of Freemasonry, Edward VII of England.
The masons worked with Protestants and Jews not only to undermine the supporters of Boulanger but to undermine France itself.
Some anti-Dreyfusard and Social Catholic members of the League could not accept this position and left the movement.

Deputy

The League's candidates in the 1902 legislative elections did poorly outside of Paris.
The League's treasurer Gabriel Syveton was elected deputy for the Seine. 
He ran in the legislative elections of 27 April 1902 for the 2nd arrondissement of Paris, and was elected in the first round.
In the Chamber of Deputies he at once took an active part in creating the nationalist and republican group, of which he was appointed secretary.
Others in the group were Godefroy Cavaignac and Albert Gauthier de Clagny.

On 6 December 1902 Syveton got into a heated exchange over the Humbert case with the Keeper of the Seals, and was temporarily excluded from the chamber until 29 January 1903.
In February and March he spoke passionately against political interference in teacher appointments. His election to the 2nd arrondissement of Paris was invalidated on 7 April 1903 at the motion of Jean Jaurès, but he was reelected to this seat in the by-election of 21 June 1903.

During the 1904 municipal elections at a meeting of 5,000 nationalist members of the Ligue des Patriotes and the Ligue de la patrie française Syveton called on the audience to have nothing to do with the antisemitic Édouard Drumont or anyone else, such as Gaston Méry, connected to La Libre Parole.
In his view antisemitism was damaging to the Patrie Française, and the party's candidates in the council elections should avoid the subject.
The slogan "Down with the Jews" should not be used at the election rallies.

Affair des Fiches

General  Louis André, the militantly anticlerical War Minister from 1900 to 1904, used reports by Freemasons to build a huge card index on public officials that detailed those who were Catholic and attended Mass, with a view to preventing their promotions.
In 1904, Jean Bidegain, assistant Secretary of Grand Orient de France, sold a selection of the files to Gabriel Syveton for 40,000 francs.
On 4 November 1904 Guyot de Villeneuve repeated the charge against André, for which he now had documentary proof, and made the issue a vote of confidence which the Combes government survived by just two votes.
After the vote Syveton crossed the floor and slapped André in the face twice.
He was at once thrown out of the Chamber and put under arrest.
The case was referred to the Court of Assizes of the Seine.

Syveton was found dead in his office by his wife on 8 December 1904, the day before his trial.
An inquiry found that he had died by asphyxiation from a malfunctioning gas heater in the room, but the press freely speculated over whether it was an accident, suicide or murder. 
It was said that his marriage was unhappy and he was well insured, so his wife would have had a motive.
It might be connected with the loss of the League's financial records.
The nationalists claimed that he had not committed suicide but had been assassinated by the Masons.
They said he had been killed in revenge for exposing the card file.
The Affaire Des Fiches scandal led directly to the resignation of prime minister Émile Combes.

Publications
Publications included:

Notes

Sources

1864 births
1904 deaths
People from Loire (department)
Politicians from Auvergne-Rhône-Alpes
French nationalists
Members of the 8th Chamber of Deputies of the French Third Republic
Members of the Ligue de la patrie française
Anti-Masonry
19th-century French historians
Unsolved deaths